Highland Township is an inactive township in Oregon County, in the U.S. state of Missouri.

Highland Township was so named on account of its elevation.

References

Townships in Missouri
Townships in Oregon County, Missouri